Carlos Sánchez may refer to:

Sports

Association football (soccer)
Carlos Sánchez (footballer, born 1978), Spanish football goalkeeper
Carlos Sánchez (Mexican footballer) (born 1980), Mexican football defender
Carlos Sánchez (Uruguayan footballer) (born 1984), Uruguayan football attacking midfielder for Peñarol
Carlos Sánchez (Colombian footballer) (born 1986), Colombian football defensive midfielder for San Lorenzo de Almagro
Carlos Sánchez (football manager) (born 1989), Spanish football coach and scout
Carlos Sánchez (Honduran footballer) (born 1990), Honduran football defender for C.D.S. Vida
Carlos Sánchez (footballer, born 2001), Spanish football right-back for Cartagena

Other sports
Carlos Sánchez (water polo) (born 1952), Cuban Olympic water polo player
Cárlos Sanchez (born 1984), ring name of professional wrestler Alex Koslov or Alex Sherman
Carlos Sánchez (boxer) (born 1988), Ecuadorian boxer
Carlos Sánchez (baseball) (born 1992), Venezuelan baseball player, better known as Yolmer Sánchez

Others
Carlos Alberto Sánchez (born 1963), Roman Catholic Archbishop of Tucumán, Argentina
Carlos Sánchez Romero (born 1970), Mexican politician
Carlos Sánchez (Colombian actor) (1935–2018), portrayed Juan Valdez
Carlos Sánchez (Dominican actor) (fl. 2010s), Dominican actor

Fictional characters
Carlos Sánchez, from the TV series The Glades